The Singapore Youth Choir (SYC) Ensemble Singers (previously known as the Singapore Youth Choir) is a distinguished choral group in Singapore formed in 1964.

The SYC Ensemble Singers is currently led by Jennifer Tham, a leading choral instructor in Singapore.

History
The Singapore Youth Choir (SYC) was formed in 1964, and was first named the Combined Schools Choir. It was set up by Benjamin Khoo, a Senior Specialist Inspector with the Ministry of Education, and David Lim, who was then a visiting music teacher working under Khoo's guidance. The choir was first conducted by Khoo from 1964 to 1970, and later by Lim from 1970 to 1989. The choir was also conducted by Lim Yau from 1982 to 1983, and has been conducted by Jennifer Tham, also a choral instructor with few secondary schools and junior colleges in Singapore, since 1989. In 2004, coinciding with its 40th anniversary, the choir was renamed the SYC Ensemble Singers.

Work in Singapore
In 1997, the SYC was a recipient of the President's Charity Award (for service to the State and community). In 2000, the SYC was the recording choir for the re-orchestration of the national anthem, Majulah Singapura, arranged by Phoon Yew Tien. In the same year, it was presented the Excellence for Singapore Award by the Singapore Totalisator Board. Additionally, the SYC has also been the recording choir for Singapore's national day parades, first in 1989 and most recently in 2007.

Participation in international festivals and competitions
In 1972, the SYC was the first choir in Singapore to participate in an overseas competition, the Tees-side International Eisteddfod in Middlesbrough, England. Notably, in 1974, it became the first Singaporean choir to win at the Llangollen Eisteddfod, with a first-placing in the Youth Choirs section. More recently, the SYC Ensemble Singers topped the contemporary music category of the 58th Concorso Polifonico Internazionale in Arezzo, Italy, and won top prizes at the 7th International Choir Festival Mundus Cantat Sopot, in Poland. Most recently, the Choir participated in the choral festival Europa Cantat 2012 in Turin, Italy, where it premiered several festival commissions and participated in ateliers.

Collaboration
The Choir has worked extensively with choirs, conductors and composers from all over the world. Collaborations have taken the form of an active commissioning program, workshops and concerts with guest conductors, and joint concerts with other choirs – notably, with the Ateneo Chamber Singers (the Philippines) and the Gaia Philharmonic Choir (Japan) in the "Three" series of concerts.

Guest conductors

Three - A Festival of 3 Asian Choirs
On 4 December 2006, the SYC Ensemble Singers, together with the Ateneo Chamber Singers (the Philippines) and the Gaia Philharmonic Choir (Japan), launched the series of concerts with the first installation of Three in Singapore. This was followed by "Three Vol. 2 Asian Sound" (2009) held in Tokyo Metropolitan Theatre, "Tatlo: A Choral Celebration" (2011) held in Cultural Center of the Philippines, Manila, and "Three in Sapporo: Songs from the South" (2013) held at the Kitara Concert Hall, Sapporo, Japan. On 14 December 2014, SYC together with Ateneo and Gaia performed "Three: 50th Anniversary Concert" at Esplanade – Theatres on the Bay.

References

External links
 

Musical groups established in 1964
Singaporean choirs